Dániel Gazdag (born 2 March 1996) is a Hungarian professional footballer who plays as a midfielder for Major League Soccer club Philadelphia Union and the Hungary national team.

Club career
In May 2021, Gazdag was signed by the Philadelphia Union of Major League Soccer. His two-year contract includes a club option for a third and fourth year for an undisclosed transfer fee, reportedly around $1.8 million. On 23 May, he made his Union debut as a substitute in a 1–0 victory at D.C. United. He scored 4 goals in the 2021 season. On July 23, 2022, Gazdag scored his tenth goal of the season for Philadelphia Union, which cemented his status as the Union's top scorer. On August 27, 2022, he scored his first career hat trick in the Union’s match against the Colorado Rapids, reaching his sixteenth goal of the MLS season. This propelled him to a top rank (second) among the top scorers in the MLS.

International career
Gazdag made his debut for the Hungary national team on 5 September 2019 in a friendly against Montenegro, as a starter.

He scored his first goal, against Andorra, on 31 March 2021.

On 1 June 2021, Gazdag was included in the final 26-man squad to represent Hungary at the rescheduled UEFA Euro 2020 tournament. On 14 June 2022 Hungary beat England 4–0 in the UEFA Nations League; Gazdag scored the last goal of the game.

Career statistics

Club

International goals 

Scores and results list Hungary's goal tally first, score column indicates score after each Gazdag goal.

Honours
Honvéd
Nemzeti Bajnokság I: 2016–17
Hungarian Cup: 2019-20

Individual
MLS Best XI: 2022

References

External links
MLSZ

1996 births
Living people
People from Nyíregyháza
Hungarian footballers
Hungary youth international footballers
Hungary under-21 international footballers
Hungary international footballers
Association football midfielders
Budapest Honvéd FC players
Budapest Honvéd FC II players
Nemzeti Bajnokság I players
Philadelphia Union players
UEFA Euro 2020 players
Hungarian expatriate footballers
Expatriate soccer players in the United States
Hungarian expatriate sportspeople in the United States
Major League Soccer players
Sportspeople from Szabolcs-Szatmár-Bereg County
Designated Players (MLS)